Trifluoroiodomethane, also referred to as trifluoromethyl iodide is a halomethane with the formula CF3I. It is an experimental alternative to Halon 1301 (CBrF3) in unoccupied areas.  It would be used as a gaseous fire suppression flooding agent for in-flight aircraft and electronic equipment fires.

Chemistry
It is used in the rhodium-catalyzed α-trifluoromethylation of α,β-unsaturated ketones.

It can be used as a new generation fire extinguishing agent to replace Halon in fire protection systems. The mechanism of extinguishing fires for CF3I is active and primarily based on interruption of the chain reaction in the combustion area of the flame by so-called "negative" catalytic action. It is also used as an eco-friendly insulation gas to replace  SF6 in electrical power industry.

In the presence of sunlight or at temperatures above 100 °C it can react with water, forming hazardous by-products such as hydrogen fluoride (HF), hydrogen iodide (HI) and carbonyl fluoride (COF2).

Environmental effects
Trifluoroiodomethane contains carbon, fluorine, and iodine atoms. Although iodine is several hundred times more efficient at destroying stratospheric ozone than chlorine, experiments have shown that because the weak C-I bond breaks easily under the influence of water (owing to the electron-attracting fluorine atoms), trifluoroiodomethane has an ozone depleting potential less than one-thousandth that of Halon 1301 (0.008-0.01). Its atmospheric lifetime, at less than 1 month, is less than 1 percent that of Halon 1301, and less even than hydrogen chloride formed from volcanoes.

There is, however, still the problem of the C-F bonds absorbing in the atmospheric window. However, the IPCC has calculated the 100-year global warming potential of trifluoroiodomethane to be 0.4 (i.e., 40% of that of CO2).

References

Further reading

External links
 
Data sheet (in Japanese)
Material Safety Data Sheet CF3I (in English)
CF3I can be used as fire extinguishing agent

Halomethanes
Fire suppression agents
Trifluoromethyl compounds
Organoiodides